Sociedad Deportiva Borja is a Spanish football team based in Borja, in the autonomous community of Aragon. Founded in 1923, it plays in Tercera División – Group 17, holding home matches at Estadio Municipal Manuel Meler.

Season to season

9 seasons in Tercera División

References

External links
 
Soccerway team profile

Football clubs in Aragon
Association football clubs established in 1923
1923 establishments in Spain